Thanos Leivaditis (also Thanos Livaditis) (30 May 1934 – 1 September 2005) was a Greek actor and screenwriter. He studied drawing at the Athens School of Fine Arts, at the workshop class of the professor Yiannis Moralis.

In 1959, he finished dramatic school at the National Theatre and worked as a playwright until 1972. He played in many roles of the classical repertoire with other actors, including Katina Paxinou, Alexis Minotis, Cybele, Christoforos Nezer, Stelios Vokovits, Thanos Kotsopoulos, and Dimitris Horn.

He entered the state theatre in 1959 with a play of Molière for Valerius.  He played roles as Aemonas in Antigone of Sophocles, Neoptolemus of Philoctetes, Malcolm in Macbeth of Shakespeare, Oedipus Rex of Sophocles, Menoikea in Phoenicians from Euripides, etc.

Thanos Leivaditis also participated in international film festivals at Théâtre des Nations (Paris) in 1962 and at the World Theatre Season (London) in 1966.

He wrote 30 screenplays and played in 24 Greek film productions or movies. In these movies, he played with the unforgettable actress Mema Stathopoulou.

The next phase of his career involved television, beginning in 1974 when he starred in Oi Dikaoi (which lasted three seasons). He also starred in Oi Axiopistoi in 1981, Oi Ierosili in 1983, I Vendeta in 1987, I Ekti Entoli in 1990 and I Diki in 1991.  He was a screenwriter and a playwright for his roles as the judge Angelos Karnezis and the journalist Aris Martelis.

He was awarded with the Corfiot Scenario Awards in 1984 for the serial Oi Ierosili.

He died on 1 September 2005 in Athens at the age of 71.

Filmography
Afisea Me Na Zizo
I Thissia Mias Ginekas
I Megalis Orkos

External links
Thanos Livaditis - Phantis Wiki 

Moviefone
moviemagnet.com

1934 births
2005 deaths
People from Lamia (city)
Greek male film actors
Greek male stage actors
Greek screenwriters
20th-century screenwriters